Joan Capri (Barcelona, July 10, 1917 - Barcelona, February 4, 2000) was a Catalan actor, humorist, and monologuist. His real name was Joan Camprubí i Alemany. His participation in plays and monologues made him an emblem of Catalan humor in the 20th century. With a kindly but incisive irony, he became a caricature of the average urban Catalan that made several generations laugh.

Works

Filmography 
 1953 Vuelo 971. Director: Rafael J. Salvia.
 1953 Concierto mágico. Director: Rafael J. Salvia.
 1953 Juzgado permanente. Director: Joaquín Luis Romero Marchent.
 1954 El padre Pitillo. Director: Juan de Orduña.
1954 Cañas y barro. Director: Juan de Orduña.
1955 Zalacaín el aventurero. Director: Juan de Orduña.
 1955 El fugitivo de Amberes. Director: Miguel Iglesias.
 1956 La legión del silencio. Director: José María Forqué.
 1956 Sucedió en mi aldea
 1957 Juanillo, papá y mamá. Director: Lorenzo Gicca Palli.
 1957 Un tesoro en el cielo
 1958 El azar se divierte
 1958 Avenida Roma, 66
 1961 Juventud a la intemperie. Director: Ignacio F. Iquino
 1962 Los castigadores. Director: Alfonso Balcázar.
 1964 Los felices 60. Director: Jaime Camino
 1968 En Baldiri de la costa. Director: Josep Maria Font
 1969 L'advocat, l'alcalde i el notari. Director: Josep Maria Font.

Discography 
 1961 El Casament (de "El fiscal Recasens") de Josep Maria de Sagarra - El nàufrag . Vergara.
 1961 El Desmemoriat -El maniàtic . Vergara.
 1962 De Madrid a Barcelona en tercera / L'inventor. Vergara
 1963 La Guerra del 600 -Les pastilles  . Vergara.
 1963 El descontent / Pobre Gonzalez!. Vergara
1664 Si vols una noia / Si vols un noi. Vergara
 1964 La Ciutat - Ja tenim minyona . Vergara.
 1965 Parla Mossèn Ventura. Vergara
 1965 El Desorientat - Com està la plaça. Vergara.
 1965 Dites i fets de mossèn Ventura . Vergara. (LP)
 1966 Els savis / Acabarem ximples. Vergara
 1967 El pis i l'estalvi / La tia Amèlia. Vergara
 1967 Futbolitis / La vida és un serial. Vergara
 1967 El casament + 5 més. Vergara (LP)
 1967 El nàufrag + 5 més. Vegara (LP)
 1968 El suïcidi / Vivendes protegides. Vergara
 1968 No som res / Ja som algú. Vergara
 1968 Futbolitis + 5 més. Vergara (LP)
 1969 El pobre viudo. Vergara (LP) - Original de Santiago Rusiñol, Gravat en directe al Teatre Romea
 1970 La tele / La moda maxi. Ariola
 1971 L'Enterramorts. Ariola.
 1971 Parla Mossèn Ventura + 4 més. Ariola-Eurodisc (LP)
 1972 El mandrós. Ariola
 1974 El Cinturó de Ronda / La primera comunió. Ariola
 1975 Quina tia / El món és així. Ariola
 1976 El taxista / Mengem massa!!!. Ariola
 1976 Com està la plaça + 4 més. Gramusic (LP)
 1977 El taxista + 6 més. Ariola (LP)
 1997 El Millor Joan Capri. BMG Music Spain (2 CD).

References 

Spanish humorists
Spanish male film actors
1917 births
2000 deaths
Male actors from Barcelona
Spanish male stage actors
Monologists
20th-century Spanish male actors
Male actors from Catalonia